Oleksiy Petrovych Shelest (born March 27, 1973 in Sumy) is a Ukrainian race walker. He is a two-time Olympian and a five-time national champion for the 50 km race walk.

Shelest first competed for the men's 50 km race walk at the 2000 Summer Olympics in Sydney, where he finished the race in thirty-second place, with a time of 4:07:39. He made a comeback from his eight-year absence at the 2008 Summer Olympics in Beijing to race for the second time in 50 km walk, along with his compatriots Serhiy Budza and Oleksiy Kazanin. Shelest improved his performance by finishing twenty-ninth in the event under four minutes, at 3:59:46.

References

External links

NBC 2008 Olympics profile

Ukrainian male racewalkers
Living people
Olympic athletes of Ukraine
Athletes (track and field) at the 2000 Summer Olympics
Athletes (track and field) at the 2008 Summer Olympics
Sportspeople from Sumy
1973 births